The Pakistan national cricket team toured India in November 2007 and played five ODIs and three Test matches between 6 November and 12 December. India won the ODI series after 24 years by a 3–2 margin, while the Test series was won by a 1–0 margin.

Background
The tour schedule was released in mid June 2007. It was announced that the Pakistan squad would arrive on 2 November and would play five ODIs followed by three Tests, the tour that would follow Australia's India tour for seven ODIs. In mid October 2007, the first three ODIs were rescheduled in that it was announced that they would be played a day each in advance, in order to accommodate the third ODI on a Sunday.

This was the fourth tour combined between the two countries in as many years. Pakistan came to India on the back of a superior record against the Indian side in both Tests and ODIs. In Tests they had a 12–8 record in their favour, while in ODIs from 1978 till the start of this series, they had won 62 per cent of the games, with the figure dropping to 57 after 2000. India also had a poor home record in ODIs against Pakistan having won six matches and lost 15 leading up to the series.

Issam Ahmed of the Telegraph felt that on the backdrop of the declaration of emergency in Pakistan and the Pakistan team's "disappointing" performance at home against South Africa, "enthusiasm on the street seems pretty hard to come by". The same state was echoed in India by The Hindu which dubbed this Pakistan team the "weakest ... to tour India" while adding that despite the "number of young players with proven ability [it] lacks names that inspire awe". It also attributed this to "playing each other every year, due to which the novelty of watching the two neighbours slug it out has waned" and that the "intensity ... has ... reduced". However, Pakistan's coach Geoff Lawson called the series "bigger than the Ashes".

Squads

A 16-member Pakistan ODI squad was named on 26 October 2007. Shoaib Akhtar who had served a ban that followed an altercation with a teammate was included in the side. From the team that played South Africa at home, Mohammad Hafeez and Khalid Latif were dropped. Younus Khan was appointed as their vice-captain. Mohammad Asif was ruled out initially for the first three ODIs, and later the subsequent ODIs and the Test series due to an elbow injury, before being replaced by Mohammad Sami leading into the Test series. India announced their squad for the first two ODIs 27 October. Rahul Dravid and Dinesh Karthik were dropped following inconsistent performances in the preceding series and were replaced by Virender Sehwag and Gautam Gambhir, with Praveen Kumar as the only new inclusion in the squad. An unchanged side announced for the next two ODIs.

Bowler Anil Kumble was named India's Test captain for the series. A 14-member squad was announced on 14 November for the first two Tests; Gautam Gambhir, Virender Sehwag and Irfan Pathan made way for spinners Harbhajan Singh and Murali Kartik. After S. Sreesanth and R. P. Singh were ruled out of the First Test owing to shoulder injury and an oblique abdominal strain respectively, Ishant Sharma and Munaf Patel, the latter recovering from injury himself, were drafted into the squad. After they lost Zaheer Khan to injury after the Second Test, India called in Irfan Pathan and V. R. V. Singh to their side for the Third. Pakistan named the same side for the Test series that played the ODIs. After Umar Gul was returned home following an injury sustained in the First Test, all-rounder Yasir Arafat was named as his replacement. Captain Shoaib Malik was ruled out of the Third Test upon failing a fitness test following an injury he suffered in the First Test. Subsequently, Younus Khan was asked to lead the side.

Tour match

After putting in Delhi to bat first in a pitch that assisted swing, Pakistan picked quick wickets reducing the hosts to 46/4. A 91-run stand between Shikhar Dhawan and Rajat Bhatia then followed before a lower order collapse took Delhi's score to 213 after 50 overs. In reply, Imran Nazir slammed 34 from 22 balls before he was removed by Amit Bhandari. Salman Butt and Misbah-ul-Haq (39) then put together a 116-run stand, with the former retiring hurt after brisk 83 off 84 balls. Subsequently, Yasir Hameed took the team home while remaining unbeaten on 33.

ODI series

1st ODI

2nd ODI

3rd ODI

4th ODI

5th ODI

Test series

1st Test

2nd Test

3rd Test

Broadcast
India's public service broadcaster Prasar Bharati bought the broadcasting rights of the entire series in India, both ODIs and Tests, in Doordarshan for  81.25 crore. It also bought rights for radio commentary for 10,000 for each ODI and Test.

References

External links
 Tour home at ESPN Cricinfo
 Pakistan to India 2007-08 at test-cricket-tours.co.uk
 

2007 in Indian cricket
2007 in Pakistani cricket
Indian cricket seasons from 2000–01
International cricket competitions in 2007–08
2007-08